Jeffrey Wammes (born 24 April 1987) is a former internationally competitive Dutch gymnast. Specializing in the floor exercise and vault, Wammes began competing on the elite level in 2005. Wammes trained alongside Yuri van Gelder at the Flik-Flak club in 's-Hertogenbosch.

Biography 
In February 2004, the 17-year-old Wammes first competed internationally.

At the 2005 American Cup in Uniondale, New York (part of the World Cup circuit that year). Wammes won gold on floor and vault. Then at the European Championships in Debrecen, he won the bronze medal for vault. At the 2005 World Championships in Melbourne, Wammes and Epke Zonderland became the first Dutch men to qualify for the all-around finals; Wammes finished fifteenth. He also qualified for the floor and vault finals, finishing fifth and eighth, respectively.

In March 2006 Wammes broke both his ankles during his floor routine at the World Cup in Lyon. His recovery lasted over six months and created a major setback in his career. However, In October, Wammes was able to participate in the World Championships in Aarhus.

In 2007, Wammes competed at the European Championships in Amsterdam. On the vault he won a bronze medal. In the all-around, he finished ninth. During the 2007 World Cup in Stuttgart, he placed fifth in the high bar finals.

Since March 2010, Wammes has been an ambassador for Right To Play. This is an international humanitarian organization to improve with sport and play programs the lives of children in the most disadvantaged areas of the world.

In 2012, Wammes competed against Epke Zonderland for the opportunity to represent the Netherlands at the Olympic Games in London. Wammes won the case, but a fracture line in his knee ended his Olympic dream for 2012. Eventually Zonderland was delegated to the Olympics where he won a golden medal on the horizontal bar.

Wammes currently performs in Cirque du Soleil's "Mystere" in Las Vegas.

Gymnastics Performance

Jeffrey Wammes was the All Around Dutch champion four times: in 2005, 2007, 2008 and 2010.

2010

The year 2010 was a particularly good year for Wammes. During the World Cup Gymnastics in October in Rotterdam he only finished in eighth place on the vault component, but during several World Cups he won many medals.

On September 12, he won gold at the vault part in the World Cup matches in Ghent.
On 20 November 2010 he won medals in three parts during the World Cup in Glasgow. He earned two bronze (on floor and vault) and won silver at the high bar. On vault he even won the World Cup. With this performance, he has secured his participation in these three components during the World Cup in 2011.

He also obtained that year in various World Cups, the following medals:
 13 March, Cottbus: bronze on floor,
 23 March, Qatar: 3x bronze on floor, vault and rings,
 11 April, Paris: silver on vault,
 15 May, Moscow: bronze on floor,
 13 November, Stuttgart: 2x silver vault and high bar.

As a token of appreciation for this good performance, on 13 December 2010 he was awarded the "Fanny" for Sportsman of Amsterdam 2010.

Personal life
Wammes was born in Utrecht, Netherlands. He first began gymnastics at the age of three after his older sister, Gabriella Wammes, introduced him to the sport. 

He studied Sport Management and Economics at the Johan Cruyff College in Amsterdam. In the same year he moved from 's-Hertogenbosch to his current hometown Amsterdam. Besides gymnastics he is working on a career as a dj.

In early 2009, Wammes had a four-year contract with the Dutch Ministry of Defense for the course "Defence Topsport Selection". Soon after his employment, Yuri van Gelder had to leave because of cocaine use; Wammes was also dismissed. The ministry offered no clarification, but indicated that Wammes "was not fit for military service", Wammes self stated: "I'm a little hidden away. They said I didn't do my best. Strange thing is that during the training this was never mentioned. It was quite a shock. When I hear that contracts by other athletes aren't renewed, I think of myself."

In 2011, Wammes came out as gay when he appeared in an edition of Linda Magazine focused on gay athletes. He stated, "There was already a lot of speculation about whether or not I fell for boys or girls. To me it has nothing to do with sport or how I perform. But when I was asked to do this, I made it clear straight away how things were and that’s that." 

In the 2016 Olympics in Rio De Janeiro, Wammes joined the record amount of openly gay, lesbian, and bisexual athletes to compete in a single Olympics. Wammes was just one of 56 competitors who publicly identified as LGBT during the Olympic games.

Media Appearances 
In 2014, Wammes appeared on the Dutch reality TV competition show Star Jumping. In the final episode, he was announced that years winner.

Also in 2014, Wammes competed in Celebrity Pole Dancing where he made it to the semifinals.

In 2019, Wammes was named an ambassador for Amsterdam Gay Pride. In an interview with Amsterdam Gay Pride's Paul Hofman, Wammes stated “It’s a great honour for me. Because personally, it means a lot to me. Actually, it is pretty strange that Pride is still needed. There is still a taboo on it.”

References

External links 
Wammes on Instagram

Wammes on Facebook

1987 births
Living people
Dutch male artistic gymnasts
Sportspeople from Utrecht (city)
Gay sportsmen
LGBT gymnasts
Dutch LGBT sportspeople
Gymnasts at the 2016 Summer Olympics
Olympic gymnasts of the Netherlands
20th-century Dutch people
21st-century Dutch people